Scholey is a surname. Notable people with the surname include:

 Annabel Scholey (born 1984), English actress
 Keith Scholey (born 1957), British producer of nature documentaries
 George Scholey (died 1839), British banker
 Mathias J. Scholey (1867-1917), English war soldier and veteran